Fior di latte may refer to:

 Mozzarella made from cow rather than buffalo milk
 A popular gelato type with no flavor added
 Fior di Latte (song), a 2017 song by Phoenix off the album Ti Amo
 "Fior Di Latte", a chapter of the serialized Japanese manga comic Agravity Boys

See also

 Latte (disambiguation)
 Fior (disambiguation)